Thomas Marcellus Denning House, also known as the Randall House, is a historic home located at Albemarle, Stanly County, North Carolina. It was designed by architect Louis H. Asbury and built in 1924–1925.  It is a two-story, double pile, Spanish Colonial Revival style brick dwelling. It features bracketed, tiled pent cornices; full-façade porch with a parapet roof; and a side/sun porch with a porte cochere. Also on the property is a contributing brick garage.

It was added to the National Register of Historic Places in 2011.

References

Houses on the National Register of Historic Places in North Carolina
Mission Revival architecture in North Carolina
Houses completed in 1925
Houses in Stanly County, North Carolina
National Register of Historic Places in Stanly County, North Carolina